Marta Susana Yanni Paxot (born February 27, 1938), best known as Rosanna Yanni or Rossana Yanni, is an Argentine film actress.

She debuted in her home town, working in revues as a chorus girl. After working two years as a fashion model in Italy, in 1963 she moved to Madrid and there began her film career.  She starred in over 40 films between 1963 and 1980, and after a long pause resumed her career in the late nineties.

Selected filmography
 The Wild Ones of San Gil Bridge (1966)
 White Comanche (1968)
 The Mark of the Wolfman (1968) a.k.a. Frankenstein's Bloody Terror, starring Paul Naschy
 Malenka, the Vampire's Niece (1969)
 Bridge Over the Elbe (1969)
 Cross Current (1971)
 Sonny and Jed (1972)
 What Am I Doing in the Middle of the Revolution? (1972)
 Hunchback of the Morgue (1973) starring Paul Naschy
 War Goddess (1973)
 Count Dracula's Great Love (1974) starring Paul Naschy
 La escopeta nacional (1977)
 Al Lìmite (1997)

References

External links 
 

1938 births
Argentine film actresses
Actresses from Buenos Aires
Living people
Spaghetti Western actresses
20th-century Argentine actresses